Rakhine State Government is the cabinet of Rakhine State. The cabinet is led by Chief Minister, Nyi Pu.

Cabinet (April 2016–present)

See also 

 Rakhine State Hluttaw
 Politics of Myanmar

References 
Rakhine State
State and region governments of Myanmar